Yosuah Hesdy Nijman (born January 2, 1996) is an American football offensive tackle for the Green Bay Packers of the National Football League (NFL). He played college football at Virginia Tech.

Early years
Born in Orange, New Jersey to Surinamese parents, Nijman was raised in nearby Maplewood and played prep football at Columbia High School.

Professional career

After playing four years at Virginia Tech, Nijman was signed by the Green Bay Packers as an undrafted free agent on May 3, 2019. He was waived on August 31 and was signed to the practice squad the next day. On November 26, he was promoted to the active roster; however, on December 21, he was placed on injured reserve after suffering an elbow injury that would keep him out for the rest of the season.

Nijman made the Packers' 53-man roster in 2020, playing mostly on special teams. He signed an exclusive-rights free agent tender with the Packers on May 6, 2021.

Nijman was named the Packers' third-string left tackle to begin the 2021 season, behind David Bakhtiari and Elgton Jenkins. After Jenkins injured his ankle in a Week 2 victory over the Detroit Lions, and with Bakhtiari still rehabilitating a torn ACL suffered during the 2020 season, Nijman made his first career start in a Week 3 victory over the San Francisco 49ers. With Jenkins remaining out, Nijman retained the starting job for a Week 4 win against the Pittsburgh Steelers and a Week 5 win against the Cincinnati Bengals before Jenkins finally returned for a Week 6 win against the Chicago Bears.

Nijman was dubbed the "World's Biggest Robot" by teammate, quarterback Aaron Rodgers, after doing "The Robot" dance during a touchdown celebration. Rodgers praised Nijman for his play, stating that he "almost forgot about that side of the line", implying he trusted Nijman to protect his blindside.

During the Packers' Week 11 game against the Minnesota Vikings, Jenkins suffered a season-ending knee injury. Nijman again stepped in during the game and remained the Packers' starting left tackle for the next several weeks. He missed several snaps during their Week 15 matchup with the Cleveland Browns, being replaced by fourth-string tackle Ben Braden, but returned later during the game. On January 9 against the Detroit Lions, the Packers named five-time All-Pro David Bakhtiari the starter for the game after he missed nearly the entire regular-season with a knee injury sustained the previous year. Bakhtiari played most of the first half, but exited the game from fatigue and Nijman replaced him for the remainder of the game. He signed his tender offer from the Packers on April 18, 2022, to keep him with the team.

Entering the 2023 offseason as a restricted free agent, the Packers placed a second round tender on Nijman on March 15, 2023.

References

External links
Green Bay Packers bio
Virginia Tech Hokies bio

1995 births
Living people
American football offensive tackles
Columbia High School (New Jersey) alumni
Green Bay Packers players
Virginia Tech Hokies football players
People from Maplewood, New Jersey
People from Orange, New Jersey
Players of American football from New Jersey
Sportspeople from Essex County, New Jersey
American people of Surinamese descent
Sportspeople of Surinamese descent
African-American players of American football
21st-century African-American sportspeople